Signal from Space is the original name of the graphic novel Life on Another Planet, originally serialized in 1978–1980.

Signal from Space may also refer to:
Signal from Space, a 2009 album by the Russian rock band Splean
Message from Space (disambiguation)